Tag (sometimes referred to as Tag TV; Tag is short for "Tagalized") was a Philippine pay television channel owned by Creative Programs, a subsidiary of media conglomerate ABS-CBN Corporation. Its programming included a line-up of Asian and Hollywood movies dubbed in Tagalog, including all the films shown on ABS-CBN's Kapamilya Blockbusters, S+A's Action Movie Zone, Cine Mo!'s Cine Pow and selected Asian movies, Yey! channel's KidSine, and Cinema One's foreign film spotlight on Blockbuster Sundays movie blocks.

On January 10, 2018, Creative Programs announced that Tag would cease its broadcast on January 15, 2018, alongside ABS-CBN Regional Channel.

References

Movie channels in the Philippines
Television networks in the Philippines
Defunct television networks in the Philippines
Television channels and stations established in 2016
Television channels and stations disestablished in 2018
Filipino-language television stations
Creative Programs
Assets owned by ABS-CBN Corporation
ABS-CBN Corporation channels